Wyoming Highway 133 (WYO 133) is a  north–south Wyoming State Road in north-central Fremont County providing travel to Pavillion.

Route description
Wyoming Highway 133 begins at US 26 and the northern terminus of Wyoming Highway 132 (Blue Sky Highway) in Kinnear. Highway 133 proceeds due north toward Pavillion. At almost 4.1 miles, the western terminus of Wyoming Highway 134 is intersected which heads east towards Shoshoni.
Past Highway 134, Pavillion is reached where the highway has its northern terminus at 6.07 miles. 

Wyoming Highway 133 and Highway 134 provide a shorter alternate around US 26 and Riverton for traffic traveling between Jackson and Casper.

Major intersections

References

External links 

Wyoming State Routes 100-199
WYO 133 - US-26/WYO 132 to WYO 134
WYO 133 - WYO 134 to Pavillion

Transportation in Fremont County, Wyoming
133